Cotoneaster glaucophyllus, commonly known as glaucous cotoneaster' or bright bead cotoneaster, is a native plant of China and the Himalayas.

Clumps of red berries are produced after flowering.

In Australia and New Zealand it is considered a weed.

Description
The leaves are dull to somewhat shiny and mid-green in colour with light green undersides.

References

External links
 
 

Flora of China
Flora of Vietnam
glaucophyllus